Simon Bailly (fl. 1416) of Wells, Somerset, was an English politician.

Family
Bailly married twice, his first wife was named Agnes; his second wife's name is unrecorded.

Career
He was a Member (MP) of the Parliament of England for Wells in October 1416.

References

Year of birth missing
15th-century deaths
People from Wells, Somerset
English MPs October 1416